Possibly in Michigan is a 1983 short musical horror film  created by Cecelia Condit. The music for the short film was created by Karen Skladany. The film is about two women being stalked by a man named Arthur.

Cast 

 Bill Blume as Arthur.
 Jill Sands as Sharon.
 Karen Skladany as Janice.

History 
The film received funding from the National Endowment for the Arts and the Ohio Arts Council. The year the film was released its final scene was shown on CBN and The 700 Club, where it was described as gay, anti-family, and anti-men. A year later the short film was read as lesbianism by the National Endowment for the Arts and was shown at the Museum of Modern Art.

The shopping mall and department store segments were shot at Beachwood Place in Beachwood, Ohio, a suburb of Cleveland.   

The short film first gained notoriety on social media in 2015, and has gained popularity among teens in generation Z.

Critical analysis 

Patricia Mellencamp and Herman Rapaport have written about the short film.

Joanne Morreale called the film an example of a revenge fantasy for feminists.

Chris Straayer said the film was about male violence against women.

References

External links 
 

1983 films
1983 horror films
1983 short films
American horror short films
1980s American films